Andrew R. Barron (born 20 May 1962) is a British chemist, academic, and entrepreneur. He is the Sêr Cymru Chair of Low Carbon Energy and Environment at Swansea University, and the Charles W. Duncan Jr.-Welch Foundation Chair in Chemistry at Rice University. He is the founder and director of Energy Safety Research Institute (ESRI) at Swansea University, which consolidates the energy research at the University with a focus on environmental impact and future security. At Rice University, he leads a Research Group and has served as Associate Dean for Industry Interactions and Technology Transfer.

Most of Barron's work has revolved around the study of nanoparticles and their applications. Early on, he studied how the structure of a molecule could overcome thermodynamic control and create new solid state structures. Some of his early work also dealt with alumoxanes and ceramic nanomaterials. In the early 2000s, his research began to focus on carbon nanomaterials, the functionalization of fullerenes and single walled carbon nanotubes. Later, application of nanotechnology to energy problems became the focal point of his work. He has authored over 440 papers and 6 books, including a book co-authored with his wife, Merrie Barron, entitled Project Management for Scientists and Engineers.

Barron is the co-founder of Oxane Materials and Natcore Technology. He was a co-founder of the Rice Alliance.

Barron has received several awards for his research and work. He received the Humboldt Senior Scientist Research Award in 1997, the Welch Foundation Norman Hackerman Award in Chemical Research in 2002 and the Lifetime Achievement Award by Houston Technology Center in Nanotechnology in 2011. He is a fellow of the Royal Society of Chemistry.

Early life and education 
Barron was born in Welwyn Garden City, and brought up in Farnham, Surrey. In 1983, Barron completed his BSc in Chemistry from Imperial College. Subsequently, he received his PhD degree in 1986 from Imperial College under the supervision of Geoffrey Wilkinson.

After completing his PhD, Barron moved to the United States and joined University of Texas at Austin for his post-doctoral research, which dealt with the chemistry of multiple bonds to phosphorus and carbon. He published the first structural characterization of a C≅P triple bond in 1988 in a paper he co-authored with Alan Cowley. In 1987, he joined Harvard University as an Assistant Professor of Chemistry and was promoted to Associate Professor in 1991. Barron founded Gallia inc. in 1992 and became Chairman of its Scientific Advisory board.

Later career 
Barron left Harvard University in 1995, when he joined Rice University as professor of Chemistry and Materials Science. He stepped down from his position at Gallia in 1997. In 1998, he was appointed as the Charles W. Duncan Jr.-Welch Foundation Chair in Chemistry at Rice University.

Following his studies on ceramic nanoparticles and the discovery of their applications, he founded Oxane Materials in 2002. The company developed nanoproducts with applications in the field of energy. Building on his research with nanoparticles, Barron founded Natcore Technology in 2004 and joined the scientific advisory board of the company. The company manufactures nanoparticles and technology with applications in the solar sectors.

From 2006 to 2008, he served as the Associate Dean of Industry Interactions and Technology Transfer at the institute. In 2013 he was appointed as the Sêr Cymru Chair of Low Carbon Energy and Environment, College of Engineering, Swansea University. He taught as a visiting professor for one year at University of Wales in 2009. Barron has served as a board member of the Houston Clean Energy Park. His research in the field of energy resulted in the foundation of Energy Safety Research Institute, which he leads, at Swansea University.  The vision of the Energy Research Safety Institute (ESRI)and Swansea University is "building the bridge to a sustainable, affordable and secure energy future."

Barron is the editor of Journal of Nanomaterials since 2013 and Scientific Reports since 2014. He is also part of the editorial boards of Main Group Chemistry and Materials Science in Semiconductor Processing. Barron has served on the advisory board of King Abdullah University of Science and Technology, Zhu Zhou International Research Institute China, and Yellow River Delta Efficient Eco-economic Development.

Research

Molecular control over solid state structure 
In the early 1990s, Barron developed interest in studying how the structure of a molecule could overcome thermodynamic control and create new solid state structures. As such, he synthesized a class of cubic Gallium chalcogenide compounds and showed that a new meta-stable phase could be synthesized.

Alumoxanes 
Following from his work on the chalcogenides, Barron was the first person to crystallographically characterise an alumoxane in 1993. These structures were spectroscopically consistent with methylalumoxane and he showed that despite being octet molecules they had significant Lewis acidity, he termed this as “Latent Lewis acidity”, and showed that this mechanism applied to a number of MAO style polymerization systems. Barron's model has been evolved by others but is essentially the same as now widely accepted.

Ceramic nanomaterials 
While investigating MAO-like structures, Barron noticed the relationship between clusters and minerals, at the same time he became interested in metalloxane polymers. He determined that these "polymers" were actually nanoparticles. Furthermore, he showed that these metal oxide nanoparticles could be chemically made by a top-down approach from mineral with which they shared their structures. With the ability to make a range of nanoparticles with different functional groups and control over size, Barron found that the structure and physical properties of macroscopic materials could be controlled by alterations at the nanometer scale.

Barron was the first to discover that nanoparticle derived ceramics could be designed to have intra-granular porosity, meaning that the pores are within the crystal grain rather than between the crystal grains as normally observed. This had implications in composites and in membranes and separation processes. Through his research, Barron developed a process that forms hollow spheres of ceramic with exceptional crush strength.

Barron rationalized that if hollow ceramic spheres could be made on a large scale they could replace dense ceramics being used in oil extraction and minimize waste. He created a spin-of company to commercialize this technology. In 2010, Barron and his team, on the request of U.S. Navy, developed a ceramic membrane with microscale pores that could filter out contaminants from waters and protect divers' wet suits without getting blocked.

Carbon nanomaterials 
Barron investigated the impact of a fullerene on wide range of systems. Initial work was concerned with the toxicity on various cell types. The results of this work demonstrated that inclusion of C60 into a peptide structure drastically lowered any toxicity effects.

In his latest work, Barron has studied catalysis with growth of single walled carbon nanotubes (SWCNTs). He pioneered the concept of amplification of a CNT.

Environmental research 
In mid 2010s, Barron returned to the issue of water purification. He has investigated the nano control over the surface of a material that allows for the creation of both super hydrophilic surfaces that allow for separation of oil and water without fouling. In this area, his research has been focused on energy problems including sustainable resources and waste recovery, reducing the impact of hydrocarbon energy sources, carbon dioxide valorisation and long-term sequestration and the next generation of the energy distribution.

Personal life 
Barron lives with his wife, Merrie Barron, in both Swansea (Wales) and Houston (Texas). Since he moved to Texas in 1990s, he has participated in motor racing as a sport. In 1999 American Lemans Series, he was team principle for team in the GTS class. He participated in the final season of USRRC under Ross Racing. Barron has previously raced Lotus Seven, Caterham Seven, and Lotus Type 61 Formula Ford. He has been SW Division SCCA E-Production Champion, 2013 Monoposto Formula Ford Champion, 2013 SVRA Group 2 Sprint Series Champion and 2014 Monoposto Formula Ford Champion. In 2018, he raced FIA Formula Opel Racing with a Formula Vauxhall Lotus.

Awards and honors 
1983 - HVA Briscoe Prize
1987 - Du Pont Young Faculty Fellow
1991 - Meldola Medal and Prize by Royal Society of Chemistry
1992 to 1994 - Alcoa Directors Fellowship 
1995 - Corday Morgan Medal and Prize
1995 - Fellow, Royal Society of Chemistry
1997 - Hümboldt Senior Scientist Research Award
2002 - Welch Foundation Norman Hackerman Award in Chemical Research
2009 - Prince of Wales Visiting Innovator
2011 - Lifetime Achievement Award in Nanotechnology 
2011 - World Technology Award (Materials)
2013 - Applied Inorganic Chemistry Award (Royal Society of Chemistry)
2016 - Erasmus+ Vilnius University
2019 - Star of Asia Award 
2020 - Adjunct Professor University of Technology Brunei

Bibliography

Books 
Alumoxanes: Rationalization of Black Box Materials (1993)
Covalent Ceramics II: Volume 327: Non-Oxides (1994)
Chemistry of Electronic Materials: From Raw Materials to Integrated Circuit. (2010)
Project Management (2013)
Chemistry of the Main Group Elements. (2014)
Physical Methods in Chemistry and Nano Science. 2018

Selected papers 
Hydrolysis of tri-tert-butylaluminum: The First Structural Characterization of Alkylalumoxanes [(R2Al)2O]n and (RAlO)n. Journal of the American Chemical Society (1993)
Three-coordinate Aluminum is not a Prerequisite for Catalytic Activity in the Zirconocene-alumoxane Polymerization of Ethylene. Journal of the American Chemical Society (1995)
From Minerals to Materials: Synthesis of Alumoxanes from the Reaction of Boehmite with Carboxylic Acids. Journal of Materials Chemistry (1995)
Single Wall Carbon Nanotube Amplification: En route to a Type-specific Growth Mechanism. Journal of the American Chemical Society (2006)
Effects of Mechanical Flexion on the Penetration of Fullerene Amino Acid-derivatized Peptide Nanoparticles Through Skin. Nano Letters (2007)
Synthesis, Characterization, and Carbon Dioxide Absorption of Covalently Attached Polyethyleneimine-functionalized Single-wall Carbon Nanotubes. ACS Nano (2008)
High-yield Organic Dispersions of Unfunctionalized Graphene. Nano Letters (2009)
Nitrene addition to exfoliated graphene: a one-step route to highly functionalized graphene, Chemical Communications (2010)
Increasing the efficiency of single walled carbon nanotube amplification by Fe–Co catalysts through the optimization of CH4/H2 partial pressures, Nano letters (2011)
Organic compounds in produced waters from shale gas wells, Environmental Science: Processes & Impacts (2014) 
Branched hydrocarbon low surface energy materials for superhydrophobic nanoparticle derived surfaces, ACS Applied Materials & Interfaces (2015)
Easily Regenerated Readily Deployable Absorbent for Heavy Metal Removal from Contaminated Water, Scientific Reports (2017)
Spatial and contamination dependent electrical properties of carbon nanotubes, Nano Letters (2017)
Superhydrophilic Functionalization of Microfiltration Ceramic Membranes Enables Separation of Hydrocarbons from Frac and Produced Water. Scientific Reports (2018)

References 

1962 births
Living people
British chemists
Rice University faculty
Alumni of Imperial College London